The Last Predators is the third studio album from Norwegian black metal band Troll.

Track listing

"Bastards Last Breath" (Intro) – 1:09	
"Fall of the Marbled Galaxy" – 3:07
"Seierens Stråler" (The Victory's Rays) – 2:55
"Mending the Instincts" – 3:50
"Colony X-11: Inflict Mythical Mayhem" – 3:04
"My Glance into the Narrow Room" – 2:32
"Eyes as in I" – 2:30
"A.T. the Riddle" – 3:40
"The Last Predators" – 4:02
"Frelserens Visjoner" (The Saviour's Visions) – 0:18
"Outro" – 0:55

Line-up

Sinister Minister Twice - vocals
Nagash (Stian Arnesen) - guitars, music
Blackheart (Amund Svensson) - synth, programming
Ursus Major - bass
Hellhammer - drums

Other information

All music composed by Nagash
All lyrics written by S.M. Twice
Distributed by Voices of Wonder AS 
Mastered at T-4's Deepspace/2000

Nagash, Blackheart, and Hellhammer are also known as Lex Icon, Psy Coma, and Von Blomberg (respectively) in the black metal/industrial metal band The Kovenant.

Nagash has also played bass for Dimmu Borgir, as well as teamed up with their frontman Shagrath to form the rock band Chrome Division.

Hellhammer has played drums for both The Kovenant and Dimmu Borgir.

Troll (Norwegian band) albums
2001 albums